Rhingia nasica is a species of syrphid fly in the family Syrphidae. Larvae associated with animal dung. Found in North America.

References

External links

Eristalinae
Diptera of North America
Hoverflies of North America
Articles created by Qbugbot
Insects described in 1823
Taxa named by Thomas Say